Daniel Fernandes may refer to:

Daniel Fernandes (judoka) (born 1973), French Olympic judoka
Daniel Fernandes (footballer) (born 1983), Canadian-born Portuguese footballer
Daniel Heuer Fernandes (born 1992), German-born Portuguese footballer
Daniel Fernandes (comedian), Mumbai comedian
Daniel Fernandes (motorcycle racer) (born 1992), Portuguese motorcycle racer

See also 
Daniel Fernandez (disambiguation)
Danny Fernandes, Canadian singer of Portuguese descent